Falkenberg (Falkenbergshus) was a fort located at  Falkenberg in Halland County, Sweden. It would later give name to the town 
of Falkenberg  which was previously known as Ätraby.

History
Falkenberg  was first mentioned in 1298.
In the early part of the 13th century the province of Halland was part of Denmark. The Danish kings had built a fortification on the east shore of the  Ätran river in the community of Falkenberg. The fort was the site for several Nordic treaties during the fourteenth century. It was burnt down by Count Erik Magnusson (c. 1282 – 1318) in 1356 during his revolt against his father King Magnus IV of Sweden.
The fortification was thereafter rebuilt.

The army of Swedish rebel leader Engelbrekt Engelbrektsson (1390s–1436)  besiege the town in 1434, under the leadership of Herman Berman. The action took place during the Engelbrekt rebellion against King Eric of Pomerania. The defenders managed the first attack successfully. They did however realise that they would not be able to continue to hold the fort. Therefore, they choose to put the fort on fire and leave it by water. The fort was destroyed and was not rebuilt.

Excavations took place in 1885, as a railway was run through the area. The fort consisted of a tower. The walls are at the thickest at the base, and becomes thinner towards the top. Above the lower, partially intact, parts were brick walls. The group which performed the excavations found remains of brick all over the excavated area. The group also found some loose remains such as weapons, tools and household goods as well as two finger rings and a silver coin.

Listed Administrators
1344 - Trotte Petersson
1356 - Bengt Algotsson
1384 - Eskil Brahe
1433-1434 - Åke Axelsson (Tott)

See also
History of Falkenberg

References

Other Sources

 Mats Dahlbom; Peter Skoglund	(2011) Falkenberg i dansk medeltid (Salmon River) 

Forts in Sweden
Ruins in Sweden
Buildings and structures in Falkenberg
Buildings and structures demolished in the 15th century